Alflen is a surname. Notable people with the surname include:

Loek Alflen (1933–2015), Dutch sport wrestler
Rob Alflen (born 1968), Dutch footballer and manager
Ted Alflen (born 1946), American football player

See also
Allen (surname)